The 36th British Academy Film Awards, given by the British Academy of Film and Television Arts in Grosvenor House Hotel, London on 20 March 1983, honoured the best films of 1982.

Winners and nominees

Statistics

See also
 55th Academy Awards
 8th César Awards
 35th Directors Guild of America Awards
 40th Golden Globe Awards
 3rd Golden Raspberry Awards
 9th Saturn Awards
 35th Writers Guild of America Awards

Film036
British Academy Film Awards
British Academy Film Awards
British Academy Film Awards
British Academy Film Awards
British Academy Film Awards